The Paradesi Synagogue aka Cochin Jewish Synagogue or the Mattancherry Synagogue (Malayalam: പരദേശി ജൂതപള്ളി) is a synagogue located in Mattancherry Jew Town, a suburb of the city of Kochi, Kerala, in India. It was built in 1568 A.D. by Samuel Castiel, David Belila, and Joseph Levi for the flourishing Paradesi Jewish community in Kochi. Cochin Jews were composed mainly of the much older Malabari Jews and the newly arrived Sephardic refugees from the Portuguese religious persecution of Jews in Spain and Portugal. It is the oldest active synagogue in the Commonwealth of Nations. Paradesi is a word used in several Indian languages, and the literal meaning of the term is "foreigners", applied to the synagogue because it was built by Sephardic or Portuguese-speaking Jews, some of them from families exiled in Aleppo, Safed and other West Asian localities.

The synagogue is located in the quarter of Old Cochin known as Jew Town, and is the only one of the seven synagogues in the area still in use, though the Kadavumbhagam Synagogue (1544 A.D) and Thekkumbhagam Synagogue (1647 A.D) (extinct) are much older and are the three synagogues in Mattancherry. The complex has four buildings. It was built adjacent to the Mattancherry Palace temple on the land given to the community by the Raja of Kochi, Rama Varma. The Mattancherry Palace temple and the Mattancherry synagogue share a common wall.

History

The Malabari Jews or Yehudan Mappila (also known as Cochin Jews) formed a prosperous trading community of Kerala, and they controlled a major portion of worldwide spice trade. In 1568, Paradesi Jews constructed the Paradesi Synagogue adjacent to Mattancherry Palace, Cochin, now part of the Indian city of Ernakulam, on land given to them by the Raja of Kochi. The first synagogue in India was built in the 4th century in Kodungallur (Cranganore) when the Jews had a merchantile role in the South Indian region (now called Kerala) along the Malabar coast. When the community moved to Kochi in the 14th century, it built a new synagogue there.

The Malabari Jews' or the Yehudan Mappila first synagogue in Cochin was destroyed in the 16th century during the Portuguese persecution of the Jews and Nasrani or Suriyani Mappila or Syriac (Aramaic) Mappila people. The second, built under the protection of the Raja, in Mattancherry, in 1558, during the Portuguese rule of Cochin, is the present synagogue, which is still in use for worship and can attract a minyan. It is called Paradesi synagogue because it was built by Spanish speaking Jews (Paradesi Jews); this contributed to the informal name: paradesi synagogue or "foreign" synagogue. In addition, a new Jewish group had immigrated to Kochi, Sephardim from the Iberian Peninsula. They and the Malabari Jews or Yehudan Mappila shared many aspects of their religion, and the newcomers learned the Judeo-Malayalam dialect, but the Sephardim also retained their own culture and Spanish language at least for three centuries. By 1660 the Dutch ruled the Kochi area, calling it Dutch Malabar. In later years, the Paradesi Synagogue was used primarily by the Sephardim (who were also referred to as Paradesi) and their descendants, and later European exiled Jews.

The Paradesi Synagogue had three classes of members: White Jews were full members. The White Jews, or Paradesi Jews, were the recent descendants of Sephardim from Spain, Portugal and the Netherlands.Black Jews, or Malabari Jews, were allowed to worship but were not admitted to full membership. These Cochin Jews were the original Jewish settlers of Cochin.Meshuchrarim, a group of freed slaves and their descendants brought by the Sephardim, they had no communal rights and no synagogue of their own. They sat on the floor or on the steps outside. In the first half of the 20th century, Abraham Barak Salem, a meshuchrar, successfully campaigned against this discrimination.

In 1968, the 400th anniversary of the synagogue was celebrated in a ceremony attended by Indira Gandhi, the Indian Prime Minister.

Present

As is customary for Orthodox Jewish or Yehudan Mappila synagogues, the Paradesi Synagogue has separate seating sections for men and women.

Today the Paradesi Synagogue is the only functioning synagogue in Kochi with a minyan (though this minyan must be formed with Jews from outside Kochi, as the number who still reside there is not sufficient). In conformity with the Hindu, St Thomas Christian or Syrian Mappila and Muslim Mappila traditions of Kerala, the worshippers are required to enter the Paradesi Synagogue barefoot. Other facets which are unique to the Cochin Jewish community, and which are results of Hindu influence, include special colours of clothing for each festival, circumcision ceremonies performed at public worship, and distribution of grape-soaked myrtle leaves on certain festivals. In addition, the current Rabbi at the Paradesi synagogue placed by Midrash Sephardi is Rabbi Yonaton Francis Goldschmidt.

The synagogue is open for a fee to visitors as a historic attraction. The ticket-seller, Yaheh Hallegua, is the last female Paradesi Jew of child-bearing age. The synagogue is closed on Fridays, Saturdays and Sundays and also on Jewish holidays. As of April 2016, only 5 Jews live in Fort Kochi.. Timing to visit the Mattanherry Synagogue is from 10:00 a.m to 1:00 p.m and then it again opens from 5:00 p.m to 7:00 p.m. There is a strict dress code for both men and women. Men have to wear full shirts and trousers and women have to wear skirts below knee length .

Objects of antiquity
The Paradesi Synagogue has the Scrolls of the Law, several gold crowns received as gifts, many Belgian glass chandeliers, and a brass-railed pulpit. It houses the 10th-century copper plates of privileges given to Joseph Rabban, the earliest known Cochin Jew. These two plates were inscribed in Old Malayalam by the ruler of the Malabar Coast. The floor of the synagogue is composed of hundreds of Chinese, 18th-century, hand-painted porcelain tiles, each of which is unique. A hand-knotted oriental rug was a gift from Haile Selassie, the last Ethiopian emperor. The synagogue has an 18th-century clock tower, which, along with other parts of the complex, was restored between 1998 and 1999 by the architect Karl Damschen under the direction of the World Monuments Fund.

A tablet from the former Kochangadi Synagogue (1344) in Kochangadi, south of Jew Town in Kochi was installed on the outer wall of the Paradesi synagogue. The inscription states that the structure was built in 5105 (in the Hebrew calendar) as "an abode for the spirit of God.". This tablet was initially discovered inserted in the wall of the Kadavumbhaagam Mattanchery Synagogue during restoration work.

Thekkumbhagom synagogue
The Thekkumbhagom synagogue, located on Jews Street in the Ernakulam area of Cochin, was built in 1580 and renovated in 1939.

 See also 
 List of Synagogues in Kerala
 Paradesi Jews
 Cochin Jews
 Kochi, India
 Synagogues in India
 Oldest synagogues in the world
 Luso-Indian

Notes

References
Paradesi Synagogue, Frommer's Review, New York Times''
Cochin Jews, Overview Of World Religions, Philtar, St Martin's College (UK).

External links

WMF – Paradesi Synagogue, Cochin archived 14 February 2005 on the Internet Archive

16th-century synagogues
Cochin Jews
Orthodox Judaism in India
Orthodox synagogues
Paradesi Jews
Sephardi Jewish culture in India
Synagogues in Kerala
Buildings and structures in Kochi
Religious buildings and structures in Ernakulam district
Religious buildings and structures completed in 1568
1568 establishments in India
Mattancherry